Horacio Vásquez is a Santo Domingo Metro station on Line 2. It was open on 1 April 2013 as part of the inaugural section of Line 2 between María Montez and Eduardo Brito. The station is located between Ramón Cáceres and Manuel de Jesús Galván.

This is an underground station built below Expreso V Centenario. It is named in honor of Horacio Vásquez.

References

Santo Domingo Metro stations
2013 establishments in the Dominican Republic
Railway stations opened in 2013